The Democrat Youth Community of Europe (DEMYC) is the international umbrella organisation of the youth wings of christian democratic, conservative and like-minded parties of Europe. With currently now more than one million affiliates in its member organisations, DEMYC is one of the strongest political youth organisations in Europe.

DEMYC is the oldest centre-right youth political formation in Europe, founded in 1964, celebrating 51 years of existence. DEMYC currently comprises 45 national organisations from 33 countries from Europe and its neighbourhood.

It is DEMYC's aim to further contacts and strengthen co-operation between its member organisations from European countries and thereby to contribute to a united Europe.

In 1973 DEMYC was granted a consultative status at the Council of Europe and since then represented its member organisations in the activities of the European Youth Centres and the European Youth Foundation.

DEMYC is a full member of the European Youth Forum, a platform of one hundred youth organisations all over Europe, promoting the interest of young people to the institutions of the European Union, the Council of Europe, and the United Nations.

The senior parties of the DEMYC member organisations followed their youth organisation's example and formed in 1978 the European Democrat Union (E.D.U.), a European-wide working association of centre-right parties. DEMYC became a permanent observer of EDU in 1979 and has been actively involved in its political work since then.

Each year DEMYC organises a number of seminars in different parts of Europe. Topics discussed at these meetings in recent years have included: the new democracies in Central and Eastern Europe and their way into a common future Europe, the European Union and its development to a unified Europe, the North-South dialogue, environmental and employment policy, the future of the welfare state, implications of the introduction of new technologies and a lot more.

On a worldwide level DEMYC has promoted the creation of the International Young Democrat Union (IYDU), thus guaranteeing permanent links to centre and centre-right parties all around the globe. Excellent relations have thereby developed to the Republican Party of the United States as well as to like-minded organisations in Latin-America, Africa and Asia

Study visits have been made to the United States, Central America, Cyprus, Israel, Southern Africa, China, Hong Kong, Turkey and to all former communist countries in Central and Eastern Europe before and after their democratisation.

The organisation was founded as the Conservative and Christian Democratic Youth Community of Europe (COCDYC) in May 1964 by the conservative and Christian democratic youth organisations from Austria, Denmark, Germany, Serbia, Hungary, Luxembourg, Norway, Sweden and the United Kingdom. The current name was adopted at the conference in Manchester in October 1975, to allow for a broader ideological spectrum.

List of Chairpersons

Executive Bureau 2018–20
The new DEMYC Executive Bureau was elected on May, 2018 by the 26th DEMYC Congress.

See also
Youth of the European People's Party (YEPP)
European Young Conservatives

External links
Democrat Youth Community of Europe – official website
The Only Constant is Change: DEMYC - 40th Anniversary – history book

Youth wings of pan-European political parties
International Young Democrat Union